Birds of Prey is a novel by science fiction / fantasy author David Drake, first published in 1984. It is related as a historical novel set in the late Roman Empire, in the second half of the Third Century. There is a science-fictional twist to the story, starting with hints of a time warp on the very first page and slowly revealing to the reader—and the protagonist—what is really going on behind the scenes. The story is told in a very vivid style, suggestive of cinematography.

Plot summary
The novel relates an episode in the life of Aulus Perennius, a middle-aged operative of the Bureau of Imperial Affairs, an agency which has evolved into an intelligence service over the life of the Empire. He is accompanied by his protégé Gaius, a dashing young cavalry officer with an unfortunate tendency to act without thinking, and an odd figure named Calvus, tall, slim, bald, incredibly strong, and rather clueless. (The story hints that Gaius is Aulus' biological son, but never makes a clear statement on the matter.)

At the beginning of the story Aulus' own mentor, head of the Bureau of Imperial Affairs, has summoned him back to Rome on a matter urgent enough to pull him out of a deep-cover operation in Palmyra just as it was coming to its critical phase. (This scene is a bit reminiscent of James Bond being summoned by his own boss for a new assignment). At the direct behest of the emperor the Bureau has been ordered to provide Calvus with any sort of support requested, and Calvus has asked only for the services of the Bureau's best agent—requesting Aulus by name.

Invoking the authority of the Bureau, Aulus orders an ancient Liburnian out of dry-dock storage to be outfitted for a trip to Cilicia in southern Anatolia, technically a part of the Roman Empire but at that time under the control of Odenath, to provide some unspecified service for Calvus. En route they are beset by pirates and other parties; the story of the journey takes up the greater part of the book. (In a sea battle with pirates, the Romans face a desperate plight due to the authorities in Rome having failed to provide an adequate Marine contingent; capture by brutal Gothic and Herulian raiders; the apparent warm hospitality offered by an isolated Christian community turns out to mask a virulently bloodthirsty, fanatic sect; a giant, predatory Allosaurus, displaced from the distant past, rampages in the countryside...)

Calvus, though taken for a male, is actually a female (of sorts) sent back from the far distant future to destroy the seed creche or "brood chamber" of monstrous aliens—intelligent social insects—who, by her time, have multiplied into billions, emerged from their underground creches, and are in the process of destroying the human race. As a desperate measure a set of six mutually telepathic sisters, including Calvus, are specially bred to be sent on the mission together. (The book hints that the future human race has evolved to be somewhat different from ourselves, and that the six sterile sisters—akin to worker ants or bees—are uncommon only in their preparation for this particular mission; there is a suggestion that, waging an existential struggle against social insects, future humanity was driven to emulate these enemies...)

Calvus is the only one of the siblings to arrive at the proper time in the past; there are strong hints that the presence of a handful of extinct creatures such as dinosaurs and sabre-toothed cats in Aulus' time are a side effect of the unintentional displacement of the other siblings into the far distant past.

The time-travel technology did not allow Calvus to take any weapons or other gadgets along, so she herself serves as the weapon. She has a limited ability to influence the thoughts of humans other than her sisters—which is how she induced the emperor to issue orders for the Bureau's cooperation—and at the end of the story she destroys the creche by self-destructing as a nuclear or thermal bomb. Before then, through her association with Aulus and separation from her sisters, she learns to experience her humanity almost in the way ordinary humans do.

Characters
 Aulus Perennius: a middle-aged Roman spy, ace agent of the Bureau of Imperial Affairs
 Gaius: a young cavalry officer, Perennius' protégé, and of whom a startling revelation is made at the book's very end
 Marcus Optatious Navigatus: Director of the Bureau of Imperial Affairs, like his agent totally dedicated to the crumbling Empire
 Calvus: the mysterious man who initiates the perilous mission, and who turns out to be female
 Sestius: a Roman centurion, brave and dedicated companion on a dangerous quest—though he planned to eventually desert
 Sabellia: a fierce, knife-carrying Gallic woman, able to make men who assault her deeply regret their act
 Father Ramphion: seemingly a paragon of Christian virtue, but those who learn the truth about him usually do not survive to tell the tale 
 Julia: a Seeress, Aulus' long-lost beloved, who might have died to save him, and on whom he might have begotten a son he never knew
 The Guardians: six highly intelligent insects, bearing energy weapons and constituting a mortal threat to humanity

Major themes
The book to some extent explores the themes of social order, the client-patron relationship, gender roles, and time travel, but for the most part is a tale of action and adventure rather than a vehicle for philosophical musings.

The story takes place in the midst of the Roman Empire's Third Century Crisis. The Empire is in a very bad shape: Emperors replace each other rapidly, usually by civil war or coup d'état; the current Emperor, Gallienus,  has effective power only in Italy and parts of North Africa; to the west, the rival Emperor Postumus rules Gaul, while to the east Palmyra has become an effectively independent power and encroaches on Imperial territory; the urban population bursts out into frequent riots; the Imperial borders are broken, with Germanic Barbarians raiding overland and into the waters of the Mediterranean. Throughout the book, the protagonist Aulus Perennius is acting under the assumption that the Empire is irrevocably doomed—and still, he is doggedly and completely devoted to this doomed Empire, even when having seen much of its seamy side. In this he is similar to Poul Anderson' Dominic Flandry (who serves a space empire consciously modeled on the Roman Empire).

Those who know the basics of Roman history are aware that in fact, this is far from the Empire's end—two decades hence, Diocletian will consolidate, launch the Dominate period and give the Empire another two centuries of life (and much longer to its eastern portion). However, the book provides a bit of secret history: The Roman Empire was indeed on the verge of collapse, about to fall already in the Third Century; it was Calvus, the traveler from the far future, who gave the Empire another lease on life. It was she who used her mental abilities to provide the young Diocletian with the qualities needed to fulfill his crucial role in history. In fact, the future Emperor had been present in the book's plot all along, though under a different name, and on the very first page Drake provides a clue of it to sharp-eyed readers. For herself, Calvus cared little about the Roman Empire and how long it would last—but she knew that to Aulus the future of the Empire was of paramount importance and that he would fight better when given such an incentive; also, contrary to her training and conditioning, she had come to care very much for Aulus and seek to make him happy...

Religion

Aulus Perennius is a staunch devotee of the Sun god, whose worship flourished in the third century Roman Empire, and calls upon this god at moments of crisis ("Unconquered Sun, Creator and Sustainer of life, give me now the strength I need!"). He does not believe in the gods of the traditional Greek-Roman Pantheon, though he respects the goddess Roma as a manifestation of the Empire to whose service he is devoted. Perennius does not care much for Christianity, lumping it together with other Oriental mystery religions: "Fools and their mystery religions, their Isis and Attis and Christos! But when there is increasingly little hope for security in the world, how could anyone blame people who look for hope elsewhere?". Still, he has a thorough knowledge of the Christians, the basics of their theology and the differences between their various factions and sects—such knowledge of the Imperial society being needed in his professional capacity. When told by Calvus—who knew his future, which was her very ancient history—that a rump of the Roman Empire (i.e., the Byzantine Empire) would endure for a thousand years as a Christian theocracy, Perennius finds that unpalatable—but still prefers a Christian Empire to no Empire at all.

Release details
 1984, USA, Baen Books/Pocket Books, Pub date ? August 1984, paperback (First edition)
 1984, UK, Simon & Schuster, Pub date ? August 1984, hardback
 1991, USA, Tor Books, Pub date ? April 1991, paperback
 1991, USA, Tom Doherty Assoc, Pub date ? April 1991, paperback
 1999, USA, Baen Books, Pub date ? February 1999, paperback

References

1984 American novels
American alternate history novels
American historical novels
American science fiction novels
Novels about time travel
Novels by David Drake
Novels set in ancient Rome
Religion in science fiction